Football Club Thy-Thisted Q is a Danish women's football club based in Thisted, Denmark. The club is currently playing in the Danish top division, the Elitedivisionen, and they play their home matches at the Sparekassen Thy Arena. The team was previously a part of Thisted FC. 

FC Thy-Thisted Q is a superstructure between the following five clubs: Koldby Hørdum IF, Nors B, IF Nordthy, Frøstrup Hannæs IF and Thisted FC.

They promoted to the Danish League, Elitedivisionen, in 2018 and qualified for the Championship round, in their first season.

Honours

Danish Women's Cup:
Winner (1): 2021
Runners-up (1): 2020

Current squad
As of 5 July 2021

Notable former players
For more former players, see :Category:FC Thy-Thisted Q players.

References

External links
 Official website

Thisted 
Football clubs in Denmark
Women's football clubs in Denmark
Association football clubs established in 2017
2017 establishments in Denmark
Furesø Municipality